Pettikadai Indru Vidumurai (lit. Petty shop on holiday today) also simply known as Pettikadai (lit. Petty shop) is a 2019 Indian Tamil sports drama film written and directed by Esakki Karvannan. The film stars Veera, Samuthirakani, Chandini Tamilarasan and Varsha Bollamma in the lead roles. The film released on 22 February 2019 alongside LKG and Kanne Kalaimaane.

Plot 

A young doctor who comes to a village and finds an online supermarket suppressing small traders and decides to fight back.

Cast 

 Samuthirakani
 Veera
 Chandini Tamilarasan as Dwaraka
 Varsha Bollamma as Thangam
 R. Sundarrajan
 Rajendran
 Priya Ashmitha
 Sundar
 Dhinakar
 Arunodhayan Lakshmanan

Soundtrack 
1. "Sudalamada Saamikitta" - Shreya Ghoshal
2. "Aasaiya Aasaiya" - Shreya Ghoshal

Reception
The Indian Express wrote "Films take us on an emotional ride. They make us smile, sob, empathise, and laugh. While some teach us a social lesson, some others make us outrage for a noble cause. Pettikadai is the kind of film which apes the latter formula, but ends up making the audience outrage about the film itself for its regressive ideas."

References 

2019 films
2010s Tamil-language films
Indian sports drama films
2010s sports drama films
2019 drama films